Spartak Moscow won their third consecutive Russian title, and sixth overall.

Overview

Standings

Results

Top goalscorers

Medal squads

See also
 1998 in Russian football
 1998 Russian First Division
 1998 Russian Second Division

External links
RSSSF

1998
1
Russia
Russia